Patrice Delévaque (born 10 September 1892) was a French field hockey player. He competed in the men's tournament at the 1928 Summer Olympics.

References

External links
 

1892 births
Year of death missing
French male field hockey players
Olympic field hockey players of France
Field hockey players at the 1928 Summer Olympics